Musa hirta is a tropical Asian species of plant in the banana family native to Sarawak on the island of Borneo, in Malaysia. It is one of fourteen species of Musa endemic to the island of Borneo.  It is placed in section Callimusa (now including the former section Australimusa), having a diploid chromosome number of 2n = 20.

References

hirta
Endemic flora of Borneo
Flora of Sarawak
Plants described in 1902
Taxa named by Odoardo Beccari